Ratnamala Prakash (born 19 August 1952) is an Indian singer who sings in Kannada language. Along with playback signing, she is known for her songs in Sugama Sangeetha, a light musical genre in Kannada. Her father R. K. Srikantan was a Carnatic classical musician. 
In 2016, Rathnamala was awarded the Sangeet Natak Academy Award for her contribution to the field of Sugama Sangeetha.

Career
Apart from numerous Bhaavageethas she has sung many film songs. Ratnamala's first film song is Tangaaliyante baalalli bande a duet with Dr.Rajkumar from the super hit movie Guri. Then she sang many songs for L. Vaidyanathan, C. Ashwath, M. Ranga Rao, Vijaya bhaskar, Rajan–Nagendra, Hamsalekha and others. Ratnmala prakash has sung many songs, including Santhasa araluva samaya a duet with SPB from the movie Elu suttina kote, Meru giriyane neeli kadalaane a duet with K. J. Yesudas from the movie SP Sangliyana Part 2, "Raayaru bandaru maavana manege" and "yava mohana murali kareyitho" from the movie Mysoru mallige,  "Gediyabeku magala", "Hudugi hoo hudugi" from the movie Naga mandala.

Discography
Film songs recorded by Rathnamala Prakash.

Awards
National Awards:
 2016 - Sangeet Natak Academy Award for Other Major Traditions of Music-Sugama Sangeetha.

State Awards:
 2016 - Santa Shishunala Sharif Award by The Kannada and Culture Department, Government of Karnataka.
 1991 - Karnataka Rajyotsava Award by Karnataka Government.
 1990 - Karnataka Kalashree Award by Karnataka Sangeetha Nrithya Academy.
Other Awards:
 2017 - Alwa's Nudisiri Award
2014 - Vocational Excellence Award by Rotary Club 
2012 - Artist of The Year award by Bala Samaja
 K. S. Narasimhaswamy Pratishtana Award
 Excellent Achievement in Sugama Sangeetha by D. Subbaramaiah Trust
2010 - Krishna Hanagal Award by ''Hanagal Foundation

References

Living people
1955 births
Kannada playback singers